Joe Gill (born 12 February 1994) is a British actor, known for playing the part of Finn Barton in the ITV soap opera Emmerdale.

Career
Gill made his acting debut during an episode on Casualty as Moxy Price in the episode titled "What You Believe" in August 2013. Gill made his first screen appearance in Emmerdale on 6 December 2013. The character and casting was announced on 5 November 2013. Of his casting, Gill said, "I'm very grateful to be given this opportunity. The cast and crew have been class with me so far and the fact I'm able to learn from these experienced professionals everyday is just brilliant. I'm hoping my character can contribute to how amazing the show is doing at the moment." Gill later left Emmerdale in late 2017 when his character was killed off unexpectedly, although the storyline had been in the works for the better part of a year. During the course of 2018/19 Gill performed in 'The Full Monty' on stage with Gary Lucy, Kai Owen, Andrew Dunn, James Redmond and Louis Emerick. He portrayed 'Lomper'.

Filmography

Television

References

External links
 

1994 births
Living people
21st-century British male actors
English male soap opera actors
Male actors from Manchester
English male stage actors